Marinus Kraus (born 13 February 1991) is a German ski jumper.

Kraus's debut in FIS Ski Jumping World Cup took place in January 2013 in Vikersund. His best result in World Cup is a second place in Kuusamo in November 2013.

References

External links 
 

1991 births
Living people
German male ski jumpers
Ski jumpers at the 2014 Winter Olympics
Olympic ski jumpers of Germany
Olympic gold medalists for Germany
Olympic medalists in ski jumping
Medalists at the 2014 Winter Olympics
People from Rosenheim (district)
Sportspeople from Upper Bavaria
21st-century German people